Who Fears the Devil? is a collection of fantasy and horror short stories by American author Manly Wade Wellman. It was released in 1963 by Arkham House in an edition of 2,058 copies and was Wellman's only book released by Arkham House.  The collection consists of all of Wellman's Silver John stories that had been published at the time.  They had all previously appeared in The Magazine of Fantasy & Science Fiction.  Wellman contributed new short sketches to the collection. The book is dedicated to Wellman's friend, the North Carolina folkorist and musician Bascom Lamar Lunsford.

Darrell Schweitzer has described the book as a classic of fantasy literature, stating Who Fears The Devil? "has genuinely enriched the field because of its unique subject matter and Wellman's heartfelt enthusiasm for it".

Contents
Who Fears the Devil? contains eleven short stories, each preceded by a "sketch" about half a page in length and with no obvious connection to the stories preceding and following it.

References

Sources

1963 short story collections
Fantasy short story collections
Horror short story collections
Works originally published in The Magazine of Fantasy & Science Fiction
Arkham House books